The  is a women's professional wrestling championship owned by the Seadlinnng promotion. The title, which is situated at the top of Seadlinnng's championship hierarchy, was introduced on October 3, 2018, and the inaugural champion was crowned on November 1, 2018, when Nanae Takahashi defeated Arisa Nakajima in the finals of an eight-woman tournament. The bottom part of the belt is blue as it resembles the ocean, while the upper part of the belt is red, which resembles the sun. The title was vacated once as a result of former champion Yoshiko taking time off to rehabilitate nagging injuries.

Like most professional wrestling championships, the title is won as a result of a scripted match. There have been nine reigns shared among seven different wrestlers. The current champion is Arisa Nakajima who is in her third reign.

Title history 
On November 1, 2018, Nanae Takahashi, the founder of Seadlinnng, defeated Arisa Nakajima in the finals of an eight-woman single-elimination tournament to become the inaugural champion. On March 9, 2021, the current champion Yoshiko vacated the title to recover from injuries. On March 17, Asuka defeated Rina Yamashita to win the vacant championship.

On October 6, 2022, the current champion Nakajima vacated the title suffering an injury. On October 19, Hiroyo Matsumoto defeated Itsuki Aoki in the finals of an ten-woman single-elimination tournament to win the vacant championship.

Inaugural championship tournament (2018) 

 – This was a technical submission.

Reigns 
Nanae Takahashi was the inaugural champion. Arisa Nakajima hold the record for most reigns at three times. Nakajima's second reign is the longest at 299 days, while Hiroyo Matsumoto has the shortest reign at 70 days. Takahashi is the oldest champion at 39 years old, while Asuka is the youngest at 22 years old.

Nakajima is the current champion in her third reign. She defeated Matsumoto on December 28, 2022, at Seadlinnng of the Year 2022!

Combined reigns 

References

External links
Seadlinnng's official website
Beyond the Sea Championship history at seadlinnng.com

Women's professional wrestling championships